Birchiș is a commune in Arad County, Romania.

The commune is situated in the contact zone of the Mureș Couloir with the Lipova Hills and it stretches over a surface of 10228 ha. It is composed of four villages: Birchiș (situated at 81 km from Arad), Căpâlnaș (Kápolnás), Ostrov (Marossziget) and Virișmort (Szádvörösmart).

Population
According to the last census the population of the commune counts 2044 inhabitants. From an ethnical point of view it has the following structure: 87.7% are Romanians, 0.5% Hungarians, 11.6 Roma and 0.2% are of other or undeclared nationalities.

History
The first documentary record of the locality Birchiș dates back to 1596. Căpâlnaș was first mentioned in 1369, Ostrov in 1169 and Virișmort in 1374.

Economy
The economy of the commune is mainly agricultural, plant-growing and livestock-breeding are well represented.

Tourism
There is a castle in Căpâlnaș, a historical and architectural monument built in the 19th century (today being a sanatorium). The commune Birchiș is well known both in the country and abroad for the ceramic products made by local craftsmen.

References

Communes in Arad County
Localities in Romanian Banat